Macksville is a small town on the Nambucca River in the Nambucca Valley, New South Wales, Australia. It is halfway between Sydney and Brisbane, along the Pacific Highway, approximately 40 minutes north of Kempsey, 40 minutes south of Coffs Harbour, 1 hour 10 minutes north of Port Macquarie, 5 hours south of Brisbane and 5 hours north of Sydney.

Demographics
This included 236 (8.5%) Indigenous persons and 2,302 (83%) others born in Australia.

Facilities
It is home to the Macksville Bridge, Macksville RSL, and Star Hotel, located on River Street and overlooking the Nambucca River. The Nambucca Valley Council chambers are located in Macksville.

History
Macksville was named after Angus Mackay and Hugh McNally, who built the Star Hotel in 1885. The town became Macks Village before changing to Macksville.

Nambucca Post Office opened on 1 August 1868 and was renamed Macksville in 1889. The first Nambucca River road bridge that carried the Pacific Highway, opened on 12 December 1931 replacing a ferry service.

Australian Test cricketer Phillip Hughes, who was born and raised in Macksville, was struck on the neck by a cricket ball in a Sheffield Shield match in November 2014, and died several days later. The funeral, held at Macksville High School, brought global attention to the quiet country town. In December 2017, the Pacific Highway bridge bypassing the town, over the Nambucca River, was named in his honour.

Heritage listings 
Macksville has a number of heritage-listed sites, including:
 North Coast railway: Macksville railway station
 River Street: Macksville Post Office

Media
Radio stations accessible in Macksville include Triple M (2CS-FM 106.3 and 2MC-FM 106.7), hit (105.5 & 105.1) and Triple J (91.5 & 96.3). There is also a Nambucca Valley community radio station (2NVR 105.9FM) which focuses on the Macksville, Bowraville, Nambucca Heads and surrounding communities. Local papers include the Midcoast Observer, Hibiscus Happynings and Guardian News. There are no local television stations but all major free-to-air networks broadcast to the town.

Sport and recreation
Macksville has a strong sporting history. Each November it holds NSW's oldest professional foot race, the 120m Macksville Gift.

Macksville is known for its passion for rugby league and has been the home of Group 2 Rugby League club Macksville Sea Eagles since 1912. Between 2002 and 2007 Macksville won five Group 2 titles.

Notable people

 Daniel Fitzhenry, rugby league player for Wests Tigers
 Matt Gillett, rugby league player for Brisbane Broncos and Australia
 Phillip Hughes, Test cricketer
 Greg Inglis, rugby league player for South Sydney Rabbitohs and Australia, spent part of his childhood in Macksville
 Albert Kelly, rugby league player for Brisbane Broncos
 Frank Partridge , decorated World War II soldier and regular on radio quiz show Pick a Box
 David Pereira, cellist
 Aden Ridgeway, former NSW Senator
 Noel Rowe, poet
 Ryan Stig, rugby league player for Newcastle Knights

Schools
 Macksville Public School
 St Patrick's Primary School

 Macksville High School

Culture, events and festivals
Macksville holds an annual show. The Macksville Show is held on the last weekend in April. The showground also hosts a range of other events throughout the year including cattle sales, the "Rusty Iron Rally" and "Pro-Ag". Since 2013 Macksville has held a river festival that includes fireworks, music, magical floating lanterns and show rides. It is organised by both Macksville and Nambucca Rotary Clubs. A new riverside stage was constructed for the 2015 event. In 2016 the event was discontinued due to being financially unviable.

Transportation
Macksville is halfway between Sydney and Brisbane on the Pacific Highway. The town was bypassed in late 2017. Macksville railway station is on North Coast railway line.

References

External links

 
Mid North Coast
Towns in New South Wales